Wielka Wieś  is a village in the administrative district of Gmina Wąchock, within Starachowice County, Świętokrzyskie Voivodeship, in south-central Poland.

The village has a population of 1,425.

References

Villages in Starachowice County
Radom Governorate
Kielce Voivodeship (1919–1939)